"Had Enough" is a song written by the Who bassist John Entwistle, and featured on their eighth studio album, Who Are You. It was also released as a double A-sided single with "Who Are You", making it Entwistle's second single A-side, after "Postcard" from Odds & Sods in 1974.

Background
Like "905", "Had Enough" was planned to feature on a rock opera in the process of being written by Entwistle, but was never finished. It was written a long time before work was started on Who Are You. The lyrics describe the main character of the failed rock opera, 905, finally snapping under the pressure and stress of his life.

"Had Enough" saw single release as a double-A side single with "Who Are You" in 1978 prior to the Who Are You album's release. Despite this, "Had Enough" received far less radio airplay than "Who Are You" but American FM rock radio played the song frequently after its release. Entwistle later joked that most people probably thought the song was a B-side because it said "Entwistle" on it. It was never performed live by the Who, although it featured in many of Entwistle's solo concerts.

Composition
"Had Enough" was the third John Entwistle composition that had Roger Daltrey on lead vocals, after "Someone's Coming" from 1967, and "Success Story" from 1975. Entwistle said of the song's composition:

Unusually for a Who song, it features a full string orchestra, which was arranged by Ted Astley. Pete Townshend said of these strings:

Roger Daltrey, however, did not approve of these strings, reportedly head-butting producer Glyn Johns over the disagreement. He later said:

Reception
Cash Box said it has "a strong guitar and keyboard presence, stout drumming and aggressive stance by Roger Daltrey" as well as "silky backing singing."

References

Songs written by John Entwistle
1978 songs
The Who songs